2019 in Indian sports describes the year's events in Indian sport.

Events

International events 

 16 November 2018 – 10 February 2019 – 2018–19 MRF Challenge Formula 2000 Championship event finished in Chennai.
 31 December 2018 – 5 January 2019 – 2019 Maharashtra Open held in Pune. Rohan Bopanna and Divij Sharan won the doubles event.
 4–10 February – 2019 Chennai Open Challenger, Chennai.
 27 February – 3 March 2019  Indian Open Snooker, Kochi.
 26–31 March – 2019 India Open Badminton, New Delhi.
 6–15 June 2019 – 2018–19 Men's FIH Hockey Series Finals in Bhubaneswar. India won gold medal.
 12–28 July – India participated in the 2019 World Aquatics Championships.
 6–11 August – 2019 Hyderabad Open Badminton, Hyderabad. Sourabh Verma wins in men's singles.
 27 September – 6 October – India participated in the 2019 World Athletics Championships.
 18–27 October – India participated in the 2019 Military World Games.
 11–17 November – 019 KPIT MSLTA Challenger Tennis, Pune. Purav Raja and Ramkumar Ramanathan won the doubles event.
 26 November – 1 December – 2019 Syed Modi International, Lucknow.
 1–10  December – India participated in the 2019 South Asian Games.
 12–21 December – India participated in the 2019 Winter Deaflympics.

Sports Leagues in 2019

Domestic leagues

References 

 
2019 in sports
2019 sport-related lists